Werkdiscs (formerly spelt as Werk Discs) is a British independent record label based in London. It was originally a club night started by Darren J. Cunningham also known as Actress, Ben Casey and Gavin Weale in the early 2000s. Werkdiscs released their first record in the summer of 2004.

Artists (present and past)
Actress
Disrupt
Atki 2
Format.K
Giganta
Helena Hauff
Lone
Lukid
Monkey Steak
Moiré
Stacs of Stamina
Starkey
Zomby

See also
List of record labels

References

External links
Werkdiscs discography
Werkdiscs Official website

Record labels established in 2004
British independent record labels
Electronic music record labels
Ninja Tune